Ande Yellanna (also known under the penname Ande Sri) is an Indian poet and lyricist.

Honours and awards
Sri wrote the song Maayamai Pothundamma Manishanavadu for the film Erra Samudram.  The Andhra Pradesh University's syllabus committee to include it in the Telugu second year graduation text books for the next academic year starting in 2009. This is the third song to feature in Telugu syllabi after Maa Telugu Thalliki and Telugu Jathi Manadi in the 77 years of Telugu cinema.

Kakatiya University conferred Sri with an honorary doctorate for his contribution as a lyricist.

Awards
 He won Nandi Award for Best Lyricist - Ganga (2006)

References

Living people
Year of birth missing (living people)
Indian lyricists
Telugu poets